Evening in Torpor was a student-project that Natalie Merchant and Rob Buck from the band 10,000 Maniacs were involved with around the time that 10,000 Maniacs was beginning. All of the songs were written by Albert Garzon. Natalie contributed vocals to "Daffodils," "Mother's Family Ring," "Crumble Down," and "Bathroom Tile Dance," while Rob contributed guitar to "Rectangles," "Daffodils," "Mother's Family Ring," The Playground," Crumble Down," and "Bathroom Tile Dance." The other tracks on the album ("les Cendriers" and "Defense Rap Trip") included no future Maniacs. The song "les Cendriers," which translates from French as "ashtrays" is the only reference to the name of the makeshift band.

The record was released by Community 3, or simply Comm3, in 1988 and taken off the market under a paid agreement with 10,000 Maniacs.

Track listing
 "Rectangles"
 "Daffodils"
 "les Cendriers"
 "Mother's Family Ring"
 "The Playground"
 "Crumble Down"
 "Defense Rap Trip"
 "Bathroom Tile Dance"

Credits
 Natalie Merchant: vocals
 Rob Buck: guitar
 Kathy Good: vocals
 Albert Garzon: drums, synthesizers, piano, vocals, drums
 Bill Zules: organ and prepared piano
 Mary Floramo: poetry & recitation
 Tracey Rammacher: vocals
 Stacey Rammacher: vocals
 Teresa Genovese: English horn
 Ken Beckenstein: drums
 Dave Hudson: cello
 Harry Jacobson: bass

External links
 Natalie Merchant's official website
 10,000 Maniacs' official website
 Palomar Agency: Albert Garzon

American experimental musical groups
10,000 Maniacs
1988 albums